Roy Dow is the head coach of the women’s basketball program at Whittier College.  Named head coach in 2016, the Poets improved their win total in each season. The 2019–20 season concluded with 17 wins, the Poets most victories in 20 seasons. He is the former head coach of the NCAA Division ll Pfeiffer University women's basketball program in Misenheimer, North Carolina. Previously, Dow was the head coach at California Lutheran University, where he was at the helm from 2008–2013. He led the women's program (Regals) to an 81–51 record, two conference championships and two NCAA tournament appearances. Dow is third all-time in wins at Cal Lu (81) and second all-time in win percentage (.610).  Dow was also the head coach of men's basketball at the California Institute of Technology. He coached at Cal Tech for six years (2002–2008). Dow appeared in the documentary Quantum Hoops, a 2007 film directed by Rick Greenwald, that follows the California Institute of Technology's basketball team—the Caltech Beavers—in their attempts to end a 21-year losing streak during the final week of the 2006 basketball season. The documentary premiered on January 26 at the 2007 Santa Barbara International Film Festival, where it won a Top 10 Audience Choice Award. It first screened in theaters on November 2, 2007 in Pasadena, California, and was featured at the 30th Denver Film Festival on November 8.  He was also the head coach of the men’s basketball program at Wheaton College (MA).  The first head coach of the program during a time when the college was transitioning to co-education from an all-women’s college.  He led the program to 2 postseason appearances after building the team from scratch.

References

External links 
Pfeiffer Women's Basketball Head Coach: Roy Dow – Bio

1962 births
Living people
American men's basketball coaches
American women's basketball coaches
Cal Lutheran Kingsmen and Regals coaches
California Lutheran University people
Caltech Beavers men's basketball coaches
Colby Mules men's basketball coaches
Pfeiffer Falcons coaches
Wheaton College (Massachusetts) people
Wheaton Lyons
Whittier Poets